Noureddine Hfaiedh (born August 27, 1973 in Jendouba) is a Tunisian volleyball player and a coach. He is 197 cm high and plays as wing spiker. 

Hfaiedh has played more than 160 games with the Tunisia men's national volleyball team and is the current captain of the team. He has participated in the Summer Olympics for Tunisia in 1996, 2004, and 2012.

Clubs

Awards

Club
3 African Champions League (2001, 2002, 2013)
1 African Cup Winners' Cup (2001)
1 French Cup (2006)
1 Japanese Cup (2007)
2 Arab Clubs Championship (1995, 2013)
7 Tunisian League (1995, 2000, 2001, 2002, 2011, 2012, 2013)
4 Tunisian Cup (1995, 1998, 2001, 2013)

National team
4 African Championship (1995, 1997, 2001, 2003)
2 Arab Championship (1996, 2002)
1 Pan Arab Games (1999)

As a Coach

2 Tunisian Volleyball Cup (2015, 2016)

Individual awards
 2003 Men's African Championship "Most Valuable Player"
 2003 Men's African Championship "Best Scorer"
 2007 Japanese Cup "Best Wing Spiker"
 2013 Arab Clubs Champions Championship "Best Spiker"
 2013 African Champions League "Most Valuable Player"
 2013 African Championship "Best Receiver"

References

Page at FivbHeroes.com
Page at FIVB.org

1973 births
Living people
People from Jendouba Governorate
Volleyball players at the 1996 Summer Olympics
Volleyball players at the 2004 Summer Olympics
Volleyball players at the 2012 Summer Olympics
Expatriate volleyball players in Greece
Expatriate volleyball players in France
Tunisian men's volleyball players
Tunisian volleyball coaches
Olympic volleyball players of Tunisia
Mediterranean Games silver medalists for Tunisia
Competitors at the 2001 Mediterranean Games
Mediterranean Games medalists in volleyball
21st-century Tunisian people